Nocello is a walnut flavored liqueur from Italy. It is produced by the Toschi Vignola s.r.l. company of Savignano sul Panaro, Province of Modena, Emilia-Romagna, Italy. The product originated in Emilia-Romagna. It is labeled "Imitation Liqueur" in the United States and is 24% alcohol by volume. The liqueur is sweet with a rounded and balanced walnut flavour with vanilla tones. Nocello is similar in taste to Frangelico. In 2004 Nocello was awarded a gold medal at the IWSC (International Wine and Spirit Competition, UK) competition for nut liquors. Similar liqueurs have "been produced since medieval times and used as medicine".

See also

 Nocino
 List of liqueurs

References

External links
Toschi official website

Italian liqueurs
Cuisine of Emilia-Romagna
Nut liqueurs